Dmitry Sergeyevich Barkov (born 19 June 1992) is an association football striker from Russia. He plays for Baltika Kaliningrad.

Career

Club
Barkov made his debut in the Russian Second Division for FC Karelia Petrozavodsk on 18 April 2011 in a game against FC Petrotrest St. Petersburg.

Barkov scored a hat-trick during JK Narva Trans' 14-0 first round Estonian Cup victory over SK Eestimaa Kasakad.

In January 2017, Barkov went on trial with Tajik Champions FC Istiklol, scoring twice in their friendly victory over CSKA Pamir Dushanbe. Barkov went on to sign a one-year contract with Istiklol in March 2017. A year later, in January 2018, Barkov went on trial with Lokomotiv Tashkent, before returning to JK Narva Trans on a one-year contract in February 2018.

He made his Russian Football National League debut for FC Khimki on 3 March 2019 in a game against FC Fakel Voronezh and scored on his debut.

On 6 July 2020, he signed with another FNL club FC SKA-Khabarovsk. He remained with Khimki until their 2019–20 Russian Cup campaign was concluded with the final game on 25 July.

Career statistics

Club

Honours
Istiklol
Tajik League (1): 2017

References

1992 births
Footballers from Saint Petersburg
Living people
Russian footballers
Association football forwards
FC Tosno players
JK Narva Trans players
FC Istiklol players
FC Khimki players
FC SKA-Khabarovsk players
FC Baltika Kaliningrad players
Russian Second League players
Meistriliiga players
Tajikistan Higher League players
Russian First League players
Russian expatriate footballers
Russian expatriate sportspeople in Estonia
Expatriate footballers in Estonia
Russian expatriate sportspeople in Tajikistan
Expatriate footballers in Tajikistan